Jñānagupta was a Buddhist monk  from Gandhara who travelled to China and was recognised by Emperor Wen of the Sui Dynasty.  He is said to have brought with him 260 sutras in Sanskrit, and was supported in translating these into Chinese by the emperor.

In total, he translated 39 scriptures in 192 fascicles during the period 561 to 592, including:
Sutra of Buddha's Fundamental Deeds, 60 fascicles
()
Candrottaradarikapariprccha, 2 fascicles
()

References

6th-century Buddhist monks
520s births
600s deaths
Sui dynasty Buddhists
Ancient Indian people
Foreign relations of ancient India
Indian Buddhist monks